Buford House may refer to:

Harry Buford House, a designated landmark in North Omaha, Nebraska
Buford House (Napa, California), listed on the National Register of Historic Places

See also 
Burford House (disambiguation)